Laci Endresz Jr. (born 28 July 1974) is an English circus performer who performs as the circus clown Mooky the Clown.

Background
Endresz was born in Eastbourne, East Sussex, England. His father, Laci Endresz Sr., was born in Hungary and is the director of the Tower Circus at Blackpool Tower, a position he has held since 1992. Seven generations of his family have performed in the circus on his father's side and nine generations on his mother's side. He made his first appearance as a clown in a circus at the age of four.

Career

Early career
In 1985 he won a bronze medal as a juggler at the Cirque de Demain Festival in Paris, France. In 1987, at the age of 12, he performed at the 12th International Circus Festival of Monte-Carlo with his sister Kate, juggling with nunchucks, five and seven rings, four and five clubs, three then five balls and finishing his act with five fire torches.

Mooky
As Mooky, Endresz has worked in most of the leading circuses in Europe, appeared on the Paul Daniels television show three times and performed at the Royal Command Performance.

Mooky stars each year in the circus show at the Tower Circus which runs throughout the summer season, and at Christmas he also appears in pantomime at the same venue. From 29 November 2009 to 17 January 2010, the pantomime was Mooky Doolittle Christmas Circus Pantomime.

In 2007 Mooky's partner Attila Endresz left for John Lawsons circus and was replaced by Mooky's brother, Tom Endresz. Tom has worked as Mooky's partner ever since.

The 2010 summer circus, entitled Mooky's Eastern Promise, ran from 27 March to 7 November.

He appeared in the second series of the Channel 4 documentary The Convention Crasher, helping Justin Lee Collins learn clowning before he travelled to the United States to participate in a clowning convention in Houston, Texas.

Other work
Endresz appeared in the 1995 film Funny Bones as a juggler. He has also performed his juggling act on the Children's Variety Performance.

Awards
As Mooky, Endresz has won a number of awards, including:

He was also twice a silver medallist in the Paris Circus Festival with his juggling act and won a Silver Cup from the Hansa Theatre in Hamburg, Germany.

Personal life
Tom Endresz, the brother of Laci, is also a clown and performs as the sidekick Mr Boo to Mooky, a Captain Jack Sparrow-style character. In the act he also performs as an illusionist.

References

Further reading

External links

English clowns
Living people
1975 births
Jugglers